Francisco de Soveral (c. 1565 in Sernancelhe, Portugal – 5 January 1642 in Angola) was a Portuguese prelate.

Biography
Father Francisco de Soveral was the son of Pedro de Soveral and Maria de Almeida, he was the brother of D. Roque de Soveral.

He visited the Santa Cruz de Coimbra Monastery and was the Canon of the Order of St. Augustine in 1588, he attended at the University of Coimbra in 1595, where he became known as D. Francisco de Soveral, father of Santa Cruz, doctorate in theology at the Faculty of Theology at the same university.  On 10 June 1619, he was deputy of the Table of the Holy Office and so on.

On 5 October 1623, he was the 9th Bishop of São Tomè on 5 October 1623 and was the 5th Bishop of Angola and Congo from 8 February 1627 to 1642.

He died on 5 January 1472 and was buried at Our Lady of Victory Church, Massangano and was transferred to Luanda Cathedral.

References

Sources
 Manuel Abranches de Soveral, Ascendências Visienses. Ensaio genealógico sobre a nobreza de Viseu. Séculos XIV a XVII (Visonian Descendants: Genealogic Essay on the Nobles of Viseu, 14th and 15th Centuries), Porto 2004, .

External links
Francisco de Soveral at Catholic Hierarchy

1565 births
1642 deaths
Portuguese Roman Catholic bishops in Africa
People from Sernancelhe
17th-century Roman Catholic bishops in São Tomé and Príncipe
Roman Catholic bishops of São Tomé and Príncipe
Augustinian bishops